Kang Eun-kyung (born July 25, 1971) is a South Korean television screenwriter. She is best known for writing hit drama King of Baking, Kim Takgu (also known as Bread, Love and Dreams), which reached a peak rating of 50.8% in 2010.

Aside from writing scripts, she also does creative duties for dramas through the drama creative group Plot Line (글Line), which she founded in 2015.

Filmography

As writer
The B-TEAM (TBA, 2020)
Dr. Romantic 2 (SBS, 2020)
Where Stars Land (SBS, 2018) 
Dr. Romantic (SBS, 2016)
What Happens to My Family? (KBS2, 2014)
 Gu Family Book (MBC, 2013) 
Glory Jane (KBS2, 2011)  
Bread, Love and Dreams (KBS2, 2010)
Formidable Rivals (KBS2, 2008)
Bichunmoo (GDTV, 2006 / SBS, 2008)
Dal-ja's Spring (KBS2, 2007)
Hello God (KBS2, 2006)
Oh Feel Young (KBS2, 2004)
Good Person (MBC, 2003)
Glass Slippers (SBS, 2002)
Hotelier (MBC, 2001)
Third Coincidence (MBC, 2001)
Ghost (SBS, 1999)
Sunday Best "Eun Bi-ryung" (KBS2, 1999)
White Nights 3.98 (SBS, 1998)
Baba Candir (TRT1, 2015)

As creative director
 The World of the Married (JTBC, 2020)
 Misty (JTBC, 2018)
 Revolutionary Love (tvN, 2017)
 My Horrible Boss (JTBC, 2016)

As creator
 Forecasting Love and Weather (JTBC, 2022)
 Now, We Are Breaking Up (SBS, 2021)
 The World of the Married (JTBC, 2020)

Awards
2014 KBS Drama Awards: Best Writer (What's With This Family)
2011 2nd Seoul Arts and Culture Awards: Best Drama Writer (King of Baking, Kim Takgu) 
2010 KBS Drama Awards: Best Writer (King of Baking, Kim Takgu) 
2010 Korea Content Awards: Prime Minister's Award in the Field of Broadcasting (King of Baking, Kim Takgu)
2010 Korean TV and Radio Writers Association: Best Writer (King of Baking, Kim Takgu)
2010 3rd Korea Drama Awards: Best Writer (King of Baking, Kim Takgu)

References

External links
 Kang Eun-kyung at CAMP ENT
 
 
 
 

1971 births
South Korean television writers
South Korean screenwriters
Living people